George Earnshaw is a Filipino sports shooter who competed at the 1996 Summer Olympics in Atlanta.

He qualified for the 1996 Summer Olympics via a wildcard ticket. Earnshaw has also competed at the Southeast Asian Games, winning at least a gold medal in double trap in the 1995 edition.

Olympic results

References

1953 births
Living people
Filipino male sport shooters
Shooters at the 1996 Summer Olympics
Asian Games medalists in shooting
Shooters at the 1974 Asian Games
Asian Games bronze medalists for the Philippines
Medalists at the 1974 Asian Games
Southeast Asian Games medalists in shooting
Southeast Asian Games gold medalists for the Philippines
Southeast Asian Games competitors for the Philippines
Olympic shooters of the Philippines
20th-century Filipino people